Perechyn is a city in Zakarpattia Oblast, Ukraine. It was the administrative centre of the former Perechyn Raion (district). It is now part of the Uzhhorod Raion.

Names

Demographics

In 2001, the population included: 
Ukrainians (96.3%)
Russians (1.3%)
Slovaks (1.0%)

About the city
The city of Perechyn is nestled between the Carpathian Mountains some twenty kilometers north of Uzhgorod.  With a population of around 7000 people, this small city swells to larger numbers on the weekends when people from neighboring villages come to shop in this rayon center and during summer when tourists traverse the lovely mountain road on their way North to Lviv.  There are many different nationalities living in harmony with one another including Ukrainians, Russians, Belarusians, Slovaks, and Hungarians.

In the main square is a statue built in honor of Fedor Feketa who traveled 30 kilometers by foot each week carrying the mail to villages throughout the region. Legend has it he started his route, while waiting for a letter from his parents.

Schools

Perechyn has three schools -a regional school (specializing in language studies), a middle/high school, and a boarding school (orphanage).

The Perechyn Humanitarian Gymnasium (a regional high school) is housed in the Palace of Culture, centrally-located and distinguished by its highly visible castle-like architecture.  In addition to preparing students for university, the gymnasium has a special focus on the development of specialized language skills including Ukrainian, Russian, Slovakian, German, and English.  Foreign visitors are very likely to find English-speakers here who will gladly help provide advice and information about the region.

Also distinguished by its architecture, the Perechyn Boarding School or "shkoli internat" sits in a U-shaped building on the outskirts of Perechyn on the road to Uzhgorod.  It houses some 135 students.  In partnership with the Charitable Foundation Opika (which means "guardian" in Ukrainian), students from this school regularly perform traditional dances, music concerts and shows, including "Perechyn Day" which is celebrated each year on the 28th of June.  The school houses a culture museum with one of the best displays of vyshyvanki (embroidery) in Zakarpattia.  Children who attend the school are taught ancient embroidery techniques and their work is often on display and for sale in the museum.

Industry

One of the largest industries in town is a factory that makes charcoal and other products.  Perechyn also has a metal recycling plant.

Gallery

References

Cities in Zakarpattia Oblast
Cities of district significance in Ukraine